Isle of Grain is the second and final album by London-based experimental rock group One More Grain.

Track listing
All tracks written by Daniel Patrick Quinn/Andrew Blick/Merek Cooper/Laurie Waller except where noted.

"Confession Time" - 4:15 	
"A Town Is What You Make It" - 4:20 	
"Jon Hassellhoff" (Daniel Patrick Quinn/Andrew Blick/Dudu Froment/Gal Moore) - 5:21 	
"Lad With A Balloon" - 3:46 	
"Under Night Streets" (Daniel Patrick Quinn/Andrew Blick/Robin Blick/Dudu Froment/Laurie Waller) - 5:17 	
"Having A Ball" - 3:13 	
"Figure Of Eight" (Daniel Patrick Quinn/Andrew Blick/Dudu Froment/Gal Moore) - 4:55 	
"Walking Off The Map" (Daniel Patrick Quinn/Andrew Blick/Robin Blick/Dudu Froment/Gal Moore)'' - 4:25

Personnel
Daniel Patrick Quinn - vocals, Juno synthesizer, guitar, violin, harmonica, oud, wine glasses, gas canisters, maracas
Andrew Blick - trumpet (& trumpet mouthpiece), programming, sound treatments, laptop computer, garagak, tbilet
Merek Cooper - bass guitar
Laurie Waller - drums & percussion

Additional musicians
Dudu Fremont - fretless bass guitar
Gal Moore - drums
Robin Blick - clarinet, tenor saxophone

References 

2008 albums
One More Grain albums